CFM Indosuez Wealth Management was established in 1922 under the name Crédit Foncier de Monaco. 

It is a subsidiary of Indosuez Wealth Management.

CFM Indosuez Wealth Management is the leading Monegasque global bank, with 5 agencies, almost around 400 employees and a trading room. 

Created in 1987, CFM Indosuez’s trading room is the first in the Principality and the Côte d’Azur, allowing real-time trading on international trading platforms.

Management 
In December 2018, Mathieu Ferragut was appointed chief executive officer.

Patronage 
CFM Indosuez is a sponsor of the Les Ballets de Monte Carlo.

References

Banks of Monaco
Banks established in 1922
Investment banks